Spilarctia xanthogaster is a moth in the family Erebidae. It was described by Thomas in 1994. It is found in Myanmar and the Indian state of Assam.

References

Moths described in 1994
xanthogaster